The 1971 Washington Darts season was the second season of the team in the North American Soccer League, and the club's fifth season in professional soccer.  This year, the team finished in third place of the Southern Division and did not qualify for the playoffs.  At the end of the year, the club folded the team and moved to Miami, fielding a new team known as the Miami Gatos for the 1972 season.

Background

Review

Competitions

NASL regular season

W = Wins, L = Losses, T= Ties, GF = Goals For, GA = Goals Against, PT= point system

6 points for a win, 
3 points for a tie,
0 points for a loss,
1 point for each goal scored up to three per game.

Results summaries

Results by round

Match reports

Statistics

Transfers

See also 
1971 Washington Darts

References 

1971
Washington Darts
Washington Darts
Washington